Skydra (in modern Greek, before 1926: Βερτεκόπ - Vertekop, Slavic: Вртикоп, Vrtikop) is a municipality in the Pella regional unit of Macedonia in Greece.

Municipality

The municipality Skydra was formed at the 2011 local government reform by the merger of the following 2 former municipalities, that became municipal units:
Meniida
Skydra

The municipality has an area of 239.525 km2, the municipal unit 120.963 km2.

Municipal unit of Skydra
Division of the municipal unit Skidra with total population 15,613 (2011). The 11 communities of Skydra are:

History 
In Skydra there is an ancient settlement in Mandalo.
The foundations of a monumental building that probably was a temple of Zeus have been uncovered.

Oral History 
Ioannis Chrissochoidis on Pontian Greeks settling in Skydra (1919-1940).

Historical Population

Sporting teams
The town hosts two football clubs: 
Aetos Skydra F.C., plays in the Greek Football League 2
Nea Genia Skydras, plays in the fifth Division of Greece (amateur league of the Pella Football Clubs Association).
In addition, Skydra has a volleyball team, Aristotelis Skydras V.C., which recently was promoted at the A2 Volleyball League.

Notable people
 Efthymis Koulouris
 Olga Strantzali

References

Populated places in Pella (regional unit)
Bottiaea
Municipalities of Central Macedonia